The Ely School House is a historic building located in Ely, Iowa, United States.  The building was built in 1923 in the Tudor Revival style.  After the building served as a school building it became  the community center for the town of Ely.  It now houses city government offices, City Council Chambers, a senior dining facility, meeting rooms  and The History Center and archives.  It has been listed on the National Register of Historic Places since 2006.

References

 Historic Ely, Iowa (Ely Community History Society)

School buildings completed in 1923
Defunct schools in Iowa
Tudor Revival architecture in Iowa
School buildings on the National Register of Historic Places in Iowa
National Register of Historic Places in Linn County, Iowa
Buildings and structures in Linn County, Iowa
1923 establishments in Iowa